Hustisford School District is a school district headquartered in Hustisford, Wisconsin.

It has two schools: John Hustis Elementary School and Hustisford Junior/Senior High School.

References

External links
 Hustisford School District
School districts in Wisconsin
Education in Dodge County, Wisconsin